Armenia selected its entry for the Junior Eurovision Song Contest through a televised national final, held on 30 September 2012, organised by the Armenian national broadcaster Public Television of Armenia (ARMTV).   The entry selected was Compass Band with the song Sweetie Baby.

Before Junior Eurovision

National final 
A submission period for artists was held until 20 August 2012. The broadcaster received 20 submissions. The seventeen finalists were revealed on 6 September 2012.

The final took place on 30 September 2012. The winner was decided through a combination of SMS voting (50%) and an "expert" jury (50%).

At Junior Eurovision

Voting

Notes

References

External links
 AMRTV website

Junior Eurovision Song Contest
Armenia
2012